Edmon Colomer is a Spanish conductor from Barcelona. He conducted Joaquín Rodrigo's Concierto de Aranjuez in 1991, in which Paco de Lucia performed with an orchestra. He has been director of the Orquesta Filarmónica de Málaga since September 2010. He has also directed the National Spanish Youth Orchestra. Sheldon Morganstern described Colomer as an "immensely gifted musician".

References

Spanish conductors (music)
Male conductors (music)
Living people
Musicians from Barcelona
21st-century conductors (music)
21st-century male musicians
Year of birth missing (living people)
Spanish male musicians